The Dordrecht Lions are an ice hockey team in Dordrecht, the Netherlands. They play in the Eredivisie, the top level of Dutch ice hockey.

History
The club was founded in 1977. They played four seasons in the Eredivisie, the top-level Dutch league, from 1993-1997. Their best finish was sixth place in the regular season with a loss in the quarterfinals in the 1995-96 season. After winning the Dutch Eerste Divise (the second tier of hockey in The Netherlands) the Dordrecht Lions joined the Eredivisie for the 2013/14 season.

Achievements
Eerste Divisie champion (2): 2000, 2013

External links
Team profile on eurohockey.com
Official website

Ice hockey teams in the Netherlands